HD 5319 b is a gas giant exoplanet discovered in 2007 in the constellation of Cetus. This planet has a minimum mass nearly two times that of Jupiter. The planet has an almost circular orbit, with an eccentricity of only 0.02 and a period of 641 days. An additional planet in the system was discovered in 2015 and may be in a 4:3 mean motion resonance with planet b.

References

Cetus (constellation)
Exoplanets discovered in 2007
Giant planets
Exoplanets detected by radial velocity

de:HD 5319 b